Elizabeth II was Queen of Malawi from 1964 to 1966, when Malawi was an independent sovereign state and a constitutional monarchy within the Commonwealth of Nations. She was also the sovereign of the other Commonwealth realms, including the United Kingdom. The 1964 Constitution of Malawi vested executive power in the monarch as head of state, though her constitutional roles were delegated to her representative, the governor-general, Sir Glyn Smallwood Jones.

History

Malawi was granted independence by the Parliament of the United Kingdom's Malawi Independence Act 1964, which transformed the Protectorate of Nyasaland into an independent sovereign state called Malawi.

The roles of the monarch and the governor-general in Malawi were abolished on 6 July 1966, when Malawi became a republic within the Commonwealth, with the president of Malawi as executive head of state and head of government.

Elizabeth visited Malawi from 22 to 25 July 1979. The Queen Elizabeth Central Hospital in Blantyre was opened in 1958 and is the largest hospital in Malawi.

Styles
Elizabeth II had the following styles in her role as the monarch of Malawi:

6 July 1964 – 1964: Elizabeth the Second, by the Grace of God, of the United Kingdom of Great Britain and Northern Ireland and of Her other Realms and Territories Queen, Head of the Commonwealth, Defender of the Faith
1964 – 6 July 1966: Elizabeth the Second, by the Grace of God Queen of Malawi and of Her other Realms and Territories, Head of the Commonwealth

Gallery

References

Further reading

Government of Malawi
Politics of Malawi
Malawi
Heads of state of Malawi
1964 establishments in Malawi
1966 disestablishments in Malawi
Malawi
Former monarchies of Africa
History of Malawi
Titles held only by one person